Maurice Degrelle (28 June 1901 – 30 April 1987) was a French sprinter. He competed at the 1924 and 1928 Summer Olympics.

References

External links
 

1901 births
1987 deaths
Sportspeople from Nord (French department)
French male sprinters
Athletes (track and field) at the 1924 Summer Olympics
Athletes (track and field) at the 1928 Summer Olympics
Olympic athletes of France